Raymond Jones (born December 24, 1947) is a former American football defensive back who played four seasons in the National Football League with the Philadelphia Eagles, Miami Dolphins, San Diego Chargers and New Orleans Saints. He was drafted by the Philadelphia Eagles in the second round of the 1970 NFL Draft. He played college football at Southern University and attended Peabody Magnet High School in Alexandria, Louisiana. Jones was also a member of the Portland Storm of the World Football League.

References

External links
Just Sports Stats
WFL profile

Living people
1947 births
Players of American football from Texas
American football defensive backs
African-American players of American football
Southern Jaguars football players
Philadelphia Eagles players
Miami Dolphins players
San Diego Chargers players
New Orleans Saints players
Portland Storm players
People from Lufkin, Texas
Peabody Magnet High School alumni
21st-century African-American people
20th-century African-American sportspeople